Márta Tolnai-Erdős (23 August 1941 – 5 July 2012) was a Hungarian gymnast. She competed at the 1964 Summer Olympics and the 1968 Summer Olympics.

References

1941 births
2012 deaths
Hungarian female artistic gymnasts
Olympic gymnasts of Hungary
Gymnasts at the 1964 Summer Olympics
Gymnasts at the 1968 Summer Olympics
Sportspeople from Pécs